Samuel David Rents (born 22 June 1987) is an English former footballer who most recently played for Eastbourne Borough as a defender.

Career
Born in Brighton, Rents signed a one-year professional contract with Brighton & Hove Albion in 2006 along with 10 others from the same youth group. He made his debut as a second-half substitute in a 1–0 defeat to Bristol City at Ashton Gate, and made his full debut a week later in Dean Wilkins' first game as manager of the club, in the 1–0 victory at Millwall's New Den stadium.

Rents also scored his first goal for the club in the first round of the FA Cup in Brighton's emphatic 8–0 victory against Northwich Victoria.

Rents was awarded with a new contract by the club during May 2007 after making his breakthrough in the first team during the 2006–07 season.

On 6 May 2008, it was revealed that Rents, along with Shane McFaul were to be released from the club.

Rents agreed a contract with Crawley Town on 23 May 2008, turning down the opportunity to join League Two Darlington. Rents was a regular fixture at left-back throughout his first two seasons at Crawley, scoring his first goal for the Red Devils in a 5–2 victory over Northwich Victoria in August 2008. On 6 June 2010, Rents signed a contract extension with Crawley Town. On 18 March 2011, Rents joined Hayes & Yeading United on loan, scoring one goal in eight appearances. He was released by Crawley Town on 13 May 2011.

On 31 May 2011, Rents joined Gateshead on an initial one-year contract. He made his debut as a late substitute in Gateshead's 3–1 win over Southport at Haig Avenue on 23 August. He made his first start for Gateshead on 29 August 2011 against Grimsby Town in a 1–0 win. Rents was released by Gateshead at the end of the season.

On 5 July 2012, it was announced that Rents would be joining Sutton United. Rents signed for Margate in January 2014 and was an integral member of the squad that won promotion to National League South in 2015. After a spell on loan at Tonbridge Angels, he joined Whitehawk in March 2016.

In June 2016, Rents signed for Isthmian League Premier newcomers Worthing.

Career statistics

References

External links

1987 births
Living people
Footballers from Brighton
English footballers
Association football defenders
Brighton & Hove Albion F.C. players
Crawley Town F.C. players
Hayes & Yeading United F.C. players
Gateshead F.C. players
Sutton United F.C. players
Margate F.C. players
Tonbridge Angels F.C. players
Whitehawk F.C. players
Worthing F.C. players
Eastbourne Borough F.C. players
English Football League players
National League (English football) players
Isthmian League players